The United States Space Forces Indo-Pacific (USSPACEFOR-INDOPAC) is the United States Space Force component field command to the United States Indo-Pacific Command. It plans, coordinates, supports, and conducts employment of space operations across the full range of military operations, including security cooperation, in support of the combatant command's objectives. It was activated on 22 November 2022.

History

Director of Space Forces, Pacific Air Forces 
USSPACEFORINDOPAC's presence in the United States Indo-Pacific Command traces back to the director of space forces (DIRSPACEFOR) construct before the establishment of the Space Force. When the Space Force was still Air Force Space Command, there would be a space operations officer called the DIRSPACEFOR in every air service component command that would advise the air component commander on matters relating to space operations. As such, there was a director of space forces assigned to Pacific Air Forces. During the standup of USSPACEFORINDOPAC, the DIRSPACEFOR staff became the new component command staff and Col Anthony J. Zilinsky III became the last director of space forces to Pacific Air Forces.

List of director of space forces 

 Col Christopher S. Putnam, July 2018 – July 2020
 Col Anthony J. Zilinsky III, October 2020 – November 2022

Establishment 

Initial plans for establishment of Space Force component field commands started in 2021 when then Colonel Anthony Mastalir was assigned as director of space forces at the Ninth Air Force and stand up the United States Space Forces Central (USSPACEFORCENT). USSPACEFORCENT was supposed to be the first Space Force component field command. In November 2021, Secretary Frank Kendall III approved the creation of Space Force elements in U.S. European Command, U.S. Central Command, and U.S. Indo-Pacific Command, but establishing those elements as component commands required Joint Chiefs of Staff approval.

By May 2022, plans were changed to first establish the USSPACEFORINDOPAC because China being the pacing threat. "We very deliberately chose INDOPACOM first because we want the nation, the Department of Defense, that combatant command, and anyone who might wish us harm in that region to understand that's what we pay attention to every single day," said General David D. Thompson after the command's activation.

On 25 October 2022, Thompson announced that the USSPACEFORINDOPAC would be established on 22 November 2022, with Mastalir taking the helm as its first commander. It would be the Space Force's first component field command, followed by the standup of component field commands in United States Central Command and United States Forces Korea. According to Mastalir, USSPACEFORINDOPAC would be initially composed of less than 100 Space Force personnel. For its first six months, the command would focus on mission analysis and planning.

In a ceremony on 22 November 2022, USSPACEFORINDOPAC was activated. Admiral John C. Aquilino handed over the unit flag to Mastalir who assumed as the first commander of USSPACEFORINDOPAC.

Structure 
 United States Space Forces Indo-Pacific (USSPACEFORINDOPAC), Joint Base Pearl Harbor–Hickam, Hawaii
 United States Space Forces Korea (USSPACEFORKOR), Osan Air Base, South Korea

Heraldry

Emblem 
The USSPACEFORINDOPAC emblem has the following symbolism:
 The North Star, Polaris, positioned at the delta's apex, reflects the Space Force's mantra, "Semper Supra," which means "always above."
 Four points mark character, connection, commitment, and courage, the four cornerstones of the Space Force's Guardian Ideal.
 Three deltas emanate from the field command's terrestrial home and represent the Spacepower disciplines of orbital warfare, space battle management, and space electronic warfare, each outlined in Victory Blue, attributed to the service's Air Force heritage.
 Gray rings and circles encircling the globe represent the primary orbits on which Guardians operate.
 The black field symbolizes the infinity of space, representing that there are no limits to what Guardians can achieve.

List of commanders

References

See also 

 United States Indo-Pacific Command
 United States Space Force
 Pacific Air Forces

United States Space Force
United States Space Force personnel